The 1987 Bowling Green Falcons football team was an American football team that represented Bowling Green University in the Mid-American Conference (MAC) during the 1987 NCAA Division I-A football season. In their second season under head coach Moe Ankney, the Falcons compiled a 5–6 record (5–3 against MAC opponents), finished in a tie for second place in the MAC, and were outscored by all opponents by a combined total of 249 to 215.

The team's statistical leaders included Rich Dackin with 2,211 passing yards, Shawn Daniels with 423 rushing yards, and Reggie Thornton with 698 receiving yards.

Schedule

References

Bowling Green
Bowling Green Falcons football seasons
Bowling Green Falcons football